Emmanuel Kwasi Afranie (24 December 1943 – 9 November 2016) was a Ghanaian football coach who managed Hearts of Oak, Asante Kotoko and the national team.

References

External links
 

1943 births
2016 deaths
Ghanaian football managers
Ghana national football team managers
Ghana women's national football team managers
Accra Hearts of Oak S.C. managers
Asante Kotoko S.C. managers
1984 African Cup of Nations managers
1999 FIFA Women's World Cup managers